Nebria salina is a species of ground beetle native to Europe.

References

External links
Images representing Nebria salina  at Barcode of Life Data System

salina
Beetles described in 1854
Beetles of Europe